The Kikusui Sho (in Japanese: 菊水賞), is a race for three-year-old stallions from Hyōgo Prefecture in the Hyogo Horse Racing Association.

Race Details

It is held at Sonoda Racecourse and is 1,700 meters in length on a dirt track.

The race is the first leg of the Hyogo Prefecture Triple Crown, alongside the Hyogo Derby and the Hyogo Championship. 

The race usually takes place in April.

Winners since 2015

Winners since 2015 include:

Past Winners

Past winners include:

See also
 Horse racing in Japan
 List of Japanese flat horse races

References

Horse races in Japan